Whirlwind Raiders is a 1948 American Western film directed by Vernon Keays and written by Norman S. Hall. The film stars Charles Starrett, Don Reynolds, Nancy Saunders, Fred F. Sears, Doye O'Dell and Smiley Burnette. The film was released on May 13, 1948, by Columbia Pictures.

Plot

Cast          
Charles Starrett as Steve Lanning / The Durango Kid
Don Reynolds as Tommy Ross 
Nancy Saunders as Claire Ross
Fred F. Sears as Tracy Beaumont
Doye O'Dell as Doye O'Dell 
Smiley Burnette as Smiley Burnette
Jack Ingram as Buff Tyson
Philip Morris as Homer Ross
Patrick Hurst as Bill Webster
Ed Parker as Red Jordan
Lynn Farr as Slim
Maudie Prickett as Mrs. Wallace
Frank LaRue as Wilson
Russell Meeker as Charlie

References

External links
 

1948 films
American Western (genre) films
1948 Western (genre) films
Columbia Pictures films
American black-and-white films
Films directed by Vernon Keays
1940s English-language films
1940s American films